
Year 233 BC was a year of the pre-Julian Roman calendar. At the time it was known as the Year of the Consulship of Verrucosus and Matho (or, less frequently, year 521 Ab urbe condita). The denomination 233 BC for this year has been used since the early medieval period, when the Anno Domini calendar era became the prevalent method in Europe for naming years.

Events 
<onlyinclude>

By place

China 
 The Zhao general Li Mu defeats the Qin army, led by Huan Yi, in the Battle of Fei.

Deaths 
 Deidamia II, Greek princess and daughter of Pyrrhus II of Epirus (approximate date)
 Han Fei, Chinese philosopher who, along with Li Si, has developed Xun Zi's philosophy into the doctrine embodied by the School of Law (or Legalism) (b. c. 280 BC)

References